Devi Chaudhurani is a Bengali novel written by Bankim Chandra Chatterjee and published in 1884. It was later translated to English by Subodh Chunder Mitter. Following closely after Anandamath, Bankim Chandra renewed call for a resurgent India that fights against oppression of the British Empire with strength from within the common people, based on traditional Indian values of austerity, dedication and selflessness. It is another important novel in the history of Bengali and Indian literature. Since it fuelled the patriotic struggle for Indian independence from the British Empire, the novel was banned by the British. The ban was lifted later by the government of India after independence. In this novel, Bankim Chandra reinforced his belief that armed face-to-face conflict with the Royal Army is the only way to win independence.

Very importantly, Bankim Chandra saw the struggle being led by a woman, the protagonist, in a time when most women remained behind the purdah and did not even show their faces to men outside their immediate families. This was a tremendous inspiration to scores of women who gradually came out of their homes and actively joined the independence struggle in the decades to come. Some feminists, however, see the ending as disappointing because the protagonist prefers to build her home instead of continuing with the independence movement.

Plot summary

Prafulla is married but is shunned by her wealthy father-in-law, Haraballabh, because of a spat between him and her mother on the day of her wedding. By custom prevalent at that time, a girl, once married, could not be divorced or remarried. Heartbroken at the fate of her only child, her mother died after a few years.

Prafulla takes the drastic step to flee in the middle of the night to find the house of her in-laws whom she has never known, without any money, with knowledge of only the name of the village and name of her father-in-law. Benevolent people, surprised to see her traveling alone, help her on the way. This is consistent with the custom in Bengal that all unknown women were to be treated as one's own mother. Her father in law rejects her and tells her to steal for a living. She goes back and through a lot of experiences meets the dacoit head Bhavani Thakur.  Bhavani Thakur adopts her, educates her with maths, philosophy, science, literature and even wrestling.  Eventually she becomes the queen of the dacoits and her intelligence and prowess are known throughout Bengal.  Devi Chaudhurani as she's known, is the Bengali version of Robin Hood who regularly takes money from the rich and helps out the poor. Throughout she leads a very ascetic lifestyle and stays humble to her roots. In the climax, as Devi agrees to help out her father in law (he does not know who she is), he tells the British about her location. Royal Army surrounds the yacht, and the Major boards it with a few soldiers. A few rowers sit on the decks quietly, offering no resistance. Only three women and two men are found in the yacht — they all are quietly waiting for him in the royal room.

When the men and women in the room recover, they are surrounded by a group of Queen's Guards who were quietly waiting disguised as sailors. In a single brilliant move, Devi has won the battle, captured the enemy leader, secured both her husband and father-in-law, and managed to do it with minimum loss of lives. The Major and other soldiers captured along with him are kept locked in. The women in the room agree to free Haraballabh and his son, if his son marries their sister. He agrees and Braja, Prafulla's husband is married to her again.

As they go back, Devi is accepted into the family and with her brains, training and leadership the family and the village thrive as never before. Devi won the battle.

Commentary

In this novel, Bankim Chandra emerged as a writer who is increasingly comfortable with weaving a complex story, and looked at all aspects of a novel. He wove together fun, family drama, a deep knowledge of local customs, with his message for independence from British. Unlike Anandamath, he put together an alternate government in place, led by an ideal leader, steeped in Indian values, directly supported by the people.

Very importantly, Bankim Chandra boldly portrayed the struggle being led by a woman, the protagonist, in a time when most women remained behind purdah and did not even show her face to men apart from her husband and siblings. He used the allegory of actual historical figures of valiant queens across India who had ably led their kingdoms and fought on battlefields. This was a tremendous inspiration to scores of women who gradually came out of their homes and actively joined the independence struggle in the decades to come. Some feminists see the ending as a disappointment however, because the protagonist preferred to build her home instead of continuing with the independence movement, and even asserted that to be the only fulfilment of a woman.

Still Bankim Chandra's achievement was great and he knew that for his story to be accepted by the conservative society around him, he has to make compromises. That compromise may well had been his own view, being a neo-conservative advocating changes to the society but none too drastic. In a complimentary way, he thought a woman's job of keeping a home together is more difficult than the challenges of the outside world. Women all across India in the next decades successfully handled their homes and still actively participated in the freedom struggle.

Bankim Chandra saw the need to defeat the Royal Army, but did not call for total destruction. He saw the conflict being waged with honor and compassion. Also, many of the Royal Army foot soldiers were Indians, and he possibly understood that such militant approach will be self-destructive. In the actual history of Indian independence movement, Mahatma Gandhi confronted the British with the weapon of nonviolence, and he condemned armed militancy and terrorist tactics adopted by some freedom fighters like Khudiram Bose and Surya Sen.

Adaptations

 The novel was later adapted into a film, Debi Chowdhurani in 1974, directed by Dinen Gupta, starring Suchitra Sen in the lead role, with Ranjit Mallick as Brajeswar, Kali Banerjee as Haraballabh, Basanta Chowdhury as Bhabani Pathak.

 In Satyajit Ray's 1966 movie Nayak, the plot involves a storyline where the protagonist gets snubbed by a senior actor while enacting Devi Chaudhurani. The protagonist was playing the role of Braja and the senior actor was playing the role of Haraballabh.

 A voice play based on the novel was held at 34/1 Elgin Road, Kolkata on April 4, 2014.

 The novel was used as the basis for a 2018 soap opera named Devi Chaudhurani, which aired on Star Jalsha.
 It was also adapted as a comic by Debrani Mitra in the 659th issue of the Indian comic book series, Amar Chitra Katha.

References

External links
  

1884 novels
Novels by Bankim Chandra Chattopadhyay
Literature of Indian independence movement
Indian Bengali-language novels
Indian novels adapted into films
Indian novels adapted into television shows
Indian novels adapted into plays
Novels adapted into comics
19th-century Indian novels